The 2008 Jelajah Malaysia, a cycling stage race that took place in Malaysia. It was held from 7 to 13 January 2008. There were seven stages with a total of 1,352.2 kilometres. In fact, the race was sanctioned by the Union Cycliste Internationale as a 2.2 category race and was part of the 2007–08 UCI Asia Tour calendar.

Tonton Susanto of Indonesia won the race, followed by Ghader Mizbani of Iran second and Fredrik Johansson of Sweden third overall. Anuar Manan of Malaysia won the points classification and Hossein Askari of Iran won the mountains classification.  won the team classification.

A total of 20 teams were invited to participate in the 2008 Jelajah Malaysia. Out of 120 riders, a total of 91 riders made it to the finish in Kuala Lumpur.

Stages

Classification leadership

Final standings

General classification

Points classification

Mountains classification

Malaysian rider classification

Team classification

Stage results

Stage 1
7 January 2008 — Putrajaya to Port Dickson,

Stage 2
8 January 2008 — Seremban to Malacca,

Stage 3
9 January 2008 — Malacca to Batu Pahat,

Stage 4
10 January 2008 — Batu Pahat to Muar,

Stage 5
11 January 2008 — Gemas to Karak,

Stage 6
12 January 2008 — Kuala Kubu Bharu to Genting Highlands,

Stage 7
13 January 2008 — Kuala Lumpur Criterium,

External links
 
 Palmares at cyclingarchives.com
 Results at cqranking.com

Jelajah Malaysia
Jelajah Malaysia
Jelajah Malaysia, 2008